Lee Jung-hwan (born March 20, 1992), better known by his stage name Sandeul is a South Korean singer-songwriter. He is a member of the South Korean boy group B1A4, that debuted on April 23, 2011. He debuted as a solo artist on October 4, 2016.

Career

Pre-debut
Lee was known to have competed in numerous singing contests prior to training and debut. Lee was approached by a company agent after performing a song by Kim Yeon-woo in a talent show. He then underwent a training period of two years.

2011: Debut with B1A4

After years of training, Lee joined as the main vocalist of B1A4. On April 11, 2011, WM Entertainment unveiled Lee as the fourth member to be revealed after the release of the news of B1A4 along with Jinyoung, Baro and Gongchan's pictures.  CNU was revealed the next day.

On April 20, 2011, B1A4 released their debut Track "OK" and mini album Let's Fly and made their debut on April 23, 2011, on MBC Show! Music Core.

After their debut, B1A4 was invited to star in MTV's reality show Match Up with Block B. As one of the projects for the show, B1A4 filmed a music video for "Only Learnt The Bad Things (못된 것만 배워서)."

2012–2014: Musicals and Immortal Songs
In May 2012, Lee made his musical debut in Brothers Were Brave, as Joo Bong. In addition, alongside some of B1A4 members, he competed on Immortal Songs number of times. In December, on the Kim Bum Ryong special, he (with Baro) took the trophy for the first time, performing "The Way to Live Like a Man".

In 2013, he entered Myongji University as a Musical Theater undergraduate. Lee continued competing on Immortal Songs. He took his second win on Yim Jae-beom special, dedicating his performance, "I'm a Candle before You", to his late aunt. In October, Lee was cast for the lead role in the musical The Thousandth Man.

In 2014, Lee was cast for the role of Elvis Presley, in the musical All Shook Up. The musical is a remake of the 2004 American jukebox musical, created from Elvis Presley's songs and based on William Shakespeare's Twelfth Night.

2015–2016: King of Mask Singer, other singing programs and Solo Debut
In April 2015, Lee competed on Mystery Music Show: King of Mask Singer. A singing competition program, where masked celebrities sing and their identities are revealed only after being eliminated. Under "Flowering Silky Fowl" stage name he became the runner-up of the first generation and, as a result, gained more recognition for his vocal ability. Afterwards, he joined as a fixed panelist on the program. On episode 17 opening, Lee performed a special duet with his role model, Kim Yeon-woo, singing "Is It Still Beautiful?" by Toy.

Lee got his fourth musical role in July, as Prince Christopher in Cinderella. 
He also acted in the web drama Loss:Time:Life.

In February 2016, Lee was cast for the role of D'Artagnan in the musical The Three Musketeers.

Throughout 2016 Lee made numerous appearances on singing competition shows: 
He returned to do a single performance on Immortal Songs alone, and later that year with B1A4 as a full group for the first time.
In April, Lee made his first appearance on Duet Song Festival with Jo Seon-young. They have been the first pair to make 3 consecutive wins, and crowned King of Kings on a special episode. He returned to the show to perform a special duet with Ken(VIXX) on episode 28.
In addition, Lee made collaborations on JTBC's Two Yoo Project Sugar Man and Girl Spirit with Baek A-yeon and Oh My Girl's Seunghee respectively.
He also returned to King of Mask Singer, as a guest panelist. 
On October 5, Lee participated in the Special Live: Your Choice! King of Mask Singer – a special live edition that brings back contestants who had been eliminated in previous episodes, and a special Mask King is chosen from live voting. Lee was chosen to be King of the live episode and was able to perform as a challenger in Episode 84. However, on that episode he lost to Ali and Kim Dong-myung of Boohwal.

In October 2016, Lee debuted as a solo artist with extended play Stay As You Are, where he first took part in writing and composing songs.

2017–2018: Varied activities and Starry Night's DJ
In February 2017, Lee became the first male idol to be appointed as an honorary ambassador for the presidential election. He was appointed alongside Kim Yeon-woo, Jung Ae-ri, Jin Se-yeon, Jang Na-ra and Yoon Joo-sang.
Later, he joined singer Kim Yeon-woo for a special performance in You Hee-yeol's Sketchbook, urging people to vote.
 In addition, a video of Kim and Lee performing a remake of the song "As One Says" was released by The National Election Commission.

In June 2017, Lee returned to Immortal Songs 2 on the Park Mi-kyung special, winning his third trophy with the song "Like a Dandelion Spore". A month later, on Summer Spent Together with Friends special, singing Yim Jae-beom's "Flight" as a duet with actor Ahn Se-ha, he took his forth trophy. At the end of that year Lee and Ahn participated in Best of the Best Competition special.

On July 6, 2017, the song "Oppa", a collaboration of Lee and Yoo Seung-woo, was released. In August, Lee featured in Primary's Pop EP.

In August 2017, Lee was confirmed to play the male lead in the musical "Thirty Something".

Lee first participated in creating B1A4's album, co-writing and co-composing the song "Like a Child", in the EP Rollin'.

On July 6, 2018, Lee was announced to be the 26th DJ for MBC's late night radio show "Starry Night" starting on July 9.

In August 2018, Lee was cast to play in the musical "Iron Mask", taking the dual part of the twins Louis and Philippe.

2019–present: Solo ventures
In March 2019, Lee participated in KBS2's In Sync\Kiss, a duet matching show. Partnered with rapper DinDin singing Lee Hi's "Breathe" they won.

During April and May 2019, WM Entertainment announced Lee is preparing for his first solo comeback, with his second EP to be released on June 3. In addition, Lee's agency informed he would hold his first Japanese and Korean solo concerts in June.

In November 2019, Lee reprised his role in the musical "Iron Mask". In February 2020, Lee took the supporting role of Clive Owen in the musical "Sherlock Holmes: The Missing Children".

On December 29, 2019, Lee received an Excellence Award for his work as a DJ in the radio show "Starry Night". On May 10, 2020, after a year and ten months, Lee stepped down as the host of the radio show.

For the first time, as a part of the variety program My Music Teacher, Mingalabar, Lee alongside his co-stars (Yoon Do-hyun, Sandara Park, Kim Jae-hwan, JooE and Yoo Jae-hwan) created children's songs.

On May 27, 2020, "Lazy Me" was released, the first song of what meant to be three part series of digital singles project called "생각집" (lit. House of Thoughts), and was followed by "Smile Box" on July 2. On August 5, My Little Thought Ep.01, Lee's third EP, was released as part three of the series, including the previous singles and "Summer Day Summer Night" as the title track. On July 20, 2020, Lee released a remake of Saevom's "Slightly Tipsy" as a soundtrack to the popular webtoon She is My Type. The remake became Lee's best-charting song to date, peaking at second on both the monthly Gaon Digital Chart and Billboards K-pop Hot 100 singles chart. On April 8, 2021, "Slightly Tipsy" received a platinum certification for streaming by Gaon.

In April 2021, Lee was confirmed to play the lead role in the musical "1976 Harlan County", that is based on the American documentary film Harlan County, USA.

Personal life 
Sandeul enlisted in the military on November 11, 2021, after completing five weeks of compulsory training, after which Sandeul will serve as a social worker.

Discography

Extended plays

Singles

As lead artist

As featured artist

Collaborations

Other charted songs

Soundtrack appearances

Production and songwriting credits

Filmography

Television dramas 
 2015: Naver TV Cast Loss: Time: Life – Min-soo
 2020: MBC
Lonely enough to love – Patient - Cameo in Ep. 1

Musical theater

Concerts 

 2019: HIBIKI (Japan)
 2019: Wind Forest (Korea)

Awards and nominations

Notes

References

External links
 Sandeul at WM Entertainment

1992 births
Japanese-language singers
Living people
South Korean male idols
South Korean male singers
South Korean pop singers
South Korean male television actors
B1A4 members
Musicians from Busan
WM Entertainment artists